Battlestar Galactica Deadlock is a turn-based strategy video game developed by Black Lab Games and published by Slitherine Software for Windows on July 15, 2021. It is based on the science fiction franchise Battlestar Galactica.

Gameplay
Battlestar Galactica Deadlock is a 3D turn-based strategy game. It uses a simultaneous turn structure (WEGO) where opponents confirm commands and are then executed at the same time. Deadlock is based the first Cylon war. There is player versus player multiplayer or two player co-op against the artificial intelligence (AI).

Release
Battlestar Galactica Deadlock was developed by Black Lab Games, a studio based in Perth, Australia. Deadlock was announced on May 16, 2017, for PC, PlayStation 4, and Xbox One. The release date was set for summer 2017. On August 31, 2017, the PC version was released. On the same day, the console versions were delayed to late 2017. The PlayStation 4 and Xbox One versions were released on December 8, 2017. A Nintendo Switch version was announced on September 25, 2019, and released on October 8, 2019. Several downloadable content (DLC) packs have been released.

Reception

Battlestar Galactica Deadlock received "generally favorable" reviews according to review aggregator Metacritic.

Caley Roark of IGN summarized: "Battlestar Galactica: Deadlock pleasantly checks a lot of boxes: Sci-fi tactics and strategy; good controls; proper Battlestar Galactica game with attention to detail. That it does so with enjoyable and challenging gameplay makes it easy to overlook the less-than-stellar graphics and interface issues in the strategy layer. So say we all."

Matt Purslow of PCGamesN summarized: "The tutorial is finicky and some of the mechanical presentation misses the mark, but its a novelty to play a tie-in game that’s not a dreadful mobile game. Deadlock may be small, but it really does capture the feeling of being on the back foot, which is what Battlestar Galactica is all about."

Peter Parrish of PC Invasion summarized: "Compelling tactical fleet combat and a middling strategic campaign layer combine with some carefully applied Galactica aesthetics. That extra attention to detail earns Deadlock a little more than a hard six."

Matt S. of Digitally Downloaded summarized: "Battlestar Galactica: Deadlock serves a particular niche; it’s for people who are both strategy game fans and Battlestar Galactica fans. I don’t know how many of us are out there, but I hope there’s enough that the entire development team gets rewarded for the excellent work that they’ve done. Yes it’s a budget game and a really authentic Battlestar Galactic experience really should also have solo flight and ground missions, but as a complement to the overall franchise, I couldn’t ask for more. This game is brilliant."

See also
Star Hammer: The Vanguard Prophecy, the previous strategy game by the same developer and publisher
Warhammer 40,000: Battlesector, the next strategy game by the same developer and publisher

References

External links
Battlestar Galactica Deadlock at Black Lab Games

2017 video games
Battlestar Galactica games
Black Lab Games games
Multiplayer and single-player video games
Multiplayer online games
Nintendo Switch games
PlayStation 4 games
Slitherine Software games
Turn-based strategy video games
Video games based on television series
Video games developed in Australia
Video games with downloadable content
Video games with expansion packs
Windows games
Xbox One games